KWNA-FM (92.7 FM) is a radio station. Licensed to serve Winnemucca, Nevada, United States, the station is currently owned by Paul and Ketra Gardner, through licensee Elko Broadcasting Company, Inc., and features country music.

References

External links

WNA-FM
Winnemucca, Nevada
Country radio stations in the United States